Harry Cohen (born 1949) is a British Labour Party politician.

Harry Cohen may also refer to:

 birth name of Harry Kane (hurdler) (born 1933), British hurdler
 Harry Cohen (died. c. 1905), founder of The Rand Daily Mail South African newspaper in 1902
 Harry Cohen (1901–1952), American early 1930s film producer - see Forging Ahead (1933)
 Harry Cohen, nominated with others for several Primetime Emmy Awards for Outstanding Sound Editing for a Limited or Anthology Series, Movie or Special and for a Comedy or Drama Series (One-Hour), as well as various Golden Reel Awards for Outstanding Achievement in Sound Editing
 Dr. Harry Cohen, made a Member of the Order of Australia - see 1995 Australia Day Honours - for contributions to medicine
 Harry Cohen, athletic trainer (1946–1958) for the Boston Celtics basketball team

See also
Henry Cohen (disambiguation)
Harold Cohen (disambiguation)
Harry Cohn (1891–1958), American president and production director of Columbia Pictures